Desmodium × humifusum is a species of flowering plant in the legume family known by the common names trailing tick-trefoil, eastern trailing tick-trefoil, and spreading tick-trefoil. It is native to the eastern United States, where it has been reduced to scattered populations in the states of Massachusetts, Connecticut, and Indiana. It once had a wider distribution but it has likely been extirpated from Delaware, Maryland, New Jersey, New York, Rhode Island, Virginia, West Virginia, and Missouri.

One plant may have a large number of stems. The leaves have persistent stipules which may aid in identification. The inflorescence is a raceme of purple flowers nearly one centimeter long. Blooming occurs in July and August. The segments are dispersed on animal fur. This species is probably a hybrid of Desmodium paniculatum and D. rotundifolium.

This plant grows on sandy soils that originated from sandstone and chert. The habitat is often dominated by oaks, and it may be a type of dry forest.

References

External links
USDA Plants Profile

humifusum
Flora of the Eastern United States
Plants described in 1824
Taxa named by Gotthilf Heinrich Ernst Muhlenberg
Plant nothospecies